Royal Sporting Club Anderlecht, usually known as Anderlecht or RSCA, is a Belgian professional football club based in Anderlecht, Brussels Capital-Region. Anderlecht plays in the Belgian First Division A and is the most successful Belgian football team in European competitions, with five trophies, as well as in the Belgian domestic league, with 34 championship wins. They have also won nine Belgian Cups and hold the record for most consecutive Belgian championship titles, winning five between the 1963–64 and 1967–68 seasons.

Founded in 1908, the club first reached the highest level in Belgian football in 1921–22 and have been playing in the first division continuously since 1935–36 and in Europe since 1964–65. They won their first major trophy after World War II with a championship win in 1946–47. Since then, they have never finished outside the top six of the Belgian first division. They are ranked 14th amongst all-time UEFA club competition winners, tenth in the International Federation of Football History & Statistics continental Clubs of the 20th Century European ranking and were 41st in the 2012 UEFA team rankings. In 1986, they achieved their best UEFA ranking with a joint first place with Juventus.

Anderlecht have been playing their matches in the Astrid Park in the municipality of Anderlecht since 1917. Their current stadium was renamed Lotto Park in 2019. Previously it was called Constant Vanden Stock Stadium which was first opened in 1983 to replace the former Emile Versé Stadium. They play in purple and white outfits. They have long-standing rivalries with Club Brugge and Standard Liège.

History

Founded as Sporting Club Anderlechtois on 27 May 1908 by a dozen football lovers at the Concordia café (located in the Rue d'Aumale/Aumalestraat in the municipality of Anderlecht), the club beat Institut Saint-Georges in their first match, 11–8. They joined the official competition in 1909–10, starting at the lowest level in the Belgian football league system, then the third provincial division. In 1912–13, they gained promotion to the second-higher level of football, then named the Promotion. After only one season at that level, the championships were suspended due to World War I, and resumed in 1919–20. With the popularity of the team increasing, Anderlecht had moved to a new stadium in the Astrid Park in 1917 (then known as Meir Park). They baptized the stadium Stade Emile Versé in honor of the club's first major patron, the industrialist Emile Versé.

At the end of the 1920–21 season, Anderlecht was promoted to the first division for the first time in their history. In the next 14 seasons, Anderlecht was relegated four times (1923, 1926, 1928 and 1931) and promoted four times (1924, 1927, 1929, 1935), earning themselves the mockery of local rival clubs Union Saint-Gilloise and Daring Club de Bruxelles, who nicknamed them the "lift club". In 1933, 25 years after their formation, the club changed their name to Royal Sporting Club Anderlechtois. Since their promotion in 1935, Anderlecht has remained at the top level of football. With Jef Mermans, a striker signed from K Tubantia FC in 1942 for a record fee of 125,000 Belgian francs, Anderlecht won their first league title in 1947. Their success increased in the following years as they won six more titles between 1949–50 and 1955–56 (winning three consecutive titles twice) and two more in 1958–59 and 1961–62. In the 1960s, under the coaching of Pierre Sinibaldi and then of Andreas Beres, the club even won five titles in a row (from 1963–64 to 1967–68), which is still a Belgian league record. The star of this team was Paul Van Himst, topscorer in 1965, 1967 and 1969 and Belgian Golden Shoe winner in 1960, 1961, 1965 and 1974.

Anderlecht played in the first European Champion Clubs' Cup in 1955–56, and lost both legs of their tie against Vörös Lobogo. They had to wait until the 1962–63 season to win their first European tie, with a 1–0 victory over Real Madrid, which followed a 3–3 draw in Spain. For the first time, they advanced to the second round, where they beat CSKA Sofia before losing to Dundee in the quarter-finals. In the 1969–70 Inter-Cities Fairs Cup, Anderlecht lost in the final against Arsenal. Between 1975 and 1984, Anderlecht only won one championship but they achieved considerable European success: they won the 1975–76 and 1977–78 European Cup Winners' Cups against West Ham United and Austria Wien respectively, as well as the two subsequent European Super Cups.

The 1982–83 season was a noteworthy season for the club for numerous reasons: former Anderlecht favourite Paul Van Himst was named the new coach, they won the 1982–83 UEFA Cup and the rebuilding of the club stadium began. But in the domestic league, Anderlecht had to settle for second place behind Standard. Their bid to retain the UEFA Cup in 1983–84 failed at the final hurdle against English side Tottenham Hotspur. Anderlecht reached the final controversially by beating another English side, Nottingham Forest, with a debatable extra time penalty to win 3–2 on aggregate. It was later found Anderlecht had bribed the referee the equivalent of £27,000 to ensure passage to the final.

After three second-place finishes in a row, the Purple and Whites secured an easy 18th title in 1984–85, 11 points ahead of Club Brugge. In 1985–86, Anderlecht won the championship again, but this time after a two-legged play-off against Club Brugge. Anderlecht won their 20th championship on the last matchday of the 1986–87 season. They then lost key players Franky Vercauteren, Enzo Scifo (transferred in the summer of 1987) and Juan Lozano (heavily injured in a game at KSV Waregem a few months earlier). A weakened team coached by Raymond Goethals finished only fourth in 1988 behind Club Brugge, KV Mechelen and Royal Antwerp, but they nonetheless managed to lift the Belgian Cup for the sixth time in club history after a 2–0 victory over Standard Liège, with goals by Luc Nilis and Eddie Krnčević. The next year, Anderlecht retained the trophy with goals by Eddie Krncevic and Milan Janković (again with a 2–0 win over Standard), but finished second in the championship. After his second cup win, Goethals left for Bordeaux in the French Ligue 1.

During the 1990s, Anderlecht reached one more European final, the 1990 European Cup Winners' Cup Final, which they lost to Italian club Sampdoria. The club then declined in European competitions, with the 1990–91 and 1996–97 UEFA Cup quarter-finals their best results. In national competition, they won four championship titles and a cup. During the 2000s, Anderlecht secured five more Belgian champion titles, reaching a total of 29 titles in 2007, in addition to one more cup victory. In the 2000–01 UEFA Champions League, they qualified for the first time to the second round, then another group stage, where they finished third in their group behind Real Madrid and Leeds United.

In 2009–10, the Purple and Whites won their 30th Belgian league title, while in the 2011–12 UEFA Europa League, Anderlecht made history by becoming the first Belgian team to finish the group stage of a European competition with the maximum number of points, dominating group opposition Lokomotiv Moscow, Sturm Graz and AEK Athens. They were also the only team of that year's Europa League to achieve this feat. On 6 May 2012, Anderlecht won their 31st Belgian championship, while on 22 July, they won their tenth Belgian Super Cup.

Colours and badge

Anderlecht colours are purple and white, and the club's home kit is generally purple with white trim, though they did wear a black and purple home kit in the 2005–06 season, and a grey in the 2007–08 season. In the beginning, purple was the main colour of the shirts. The motto of Anderlecht ("Mens sana in corpore sano") is written on its badge as are the three letters "SCA", referring to the initial name of the club (Sporting Club Anderlechtois). A crown was added in 1933 following the name change to Royal Sporting Club Anderlechtois. Anderlecht's colours was inspired by Belgian immigrants that lived in Antigua Guatemala. Purple is the color of the city of Antigua and the color of the Belgian monarchy.

Stadium

Anderlecht play their home matches at the Lotto Park stadium located within the Astrid Park in the municipality of Anderlecht. It currently has a capacity of 22,500 places. The works started in 2011 and lasted two years. Anderlecht has been playing in the Astrid Park since the building of the Emile Versé Stadium in 1917. The stadium was completely rebuilt in 1983 and renamed in honour of the then chairman Constant Vanden Stock. Prior to 1917, the club has played on a pitch in the current Rue du Serment/Eedstraat for a couple of years since 1908, then in a stadium located in Rue Verheydenstraat (now Rue Démosthènestraat). In 2013 the stadium was refurbished, with installation of new scoreboards and advertising strips alongside the border of the pitch in accordance with UEFA regulations for the Champions League. ColosseoEAS was chosen as the provider for the ultra-modern LED strips and their controllers. In July 2019, the new owner Marck Coucke sold the naming rights to the firm Lotto, and changed the name to Lotto Park.

Anderlecht were due to move to the 60,000 capacity Eurostadium upon its expected completion in 2019. The Eurostadium will also become the home of the Belgium national team and will host fixtures in UEFA Euro 2020. However, during the years that followed, the project was plagued by numerous delays caused by political infighting. In February 2017, Anderlecht eventually pulled out of the project. In the 2018–19 season, Anderlecht drew an average home attendance of 18,536 in 15 league games at their stadium.

Supporters
The club had the highest average attendance in the Belgian First Division for ten years, until 2004–05. Anderlecht supporters hail from all over the country and only a minority come from the Brussels Capital Region. Anderlecht counts 77 fan clubs, of which 5 are abroad (one in France, one in Poland, one in Texas, USA, one in Montreal, Canada and one in Sunderland, England).

Rivals

Anderlecht's main rivals are Standard Liege and Club Brugge.

Honours

Domestic

Leagues
Belgian First Division:
Winners (34) (record): 1946–47, 1948–49, 1949–50, 1950–51, 1953–54, 1954–55, 1955–56, 1958–59, 1961–62, 1963–64, 1964–65, 1965–66, 1966–67, 1967–68, 1971–72, 1973–74, 1980–81, 1984–85, 1985–86, 1986–87, 1990–91, 1992–93, 1993–94, 1994–95, 1999–2000, 2000–01, 2003–04, 2005–06, 2006–07, 2009–10, 2011–12, 2012–13, 2013–14, 2016–17

Cups
Belgian Cup:
Winners (9): 1964–65, 1971–72, 1972–73, 1974–75, 1975–76, 1987–88, 1988–89, 1993–94, 2007–08
Belgian League Cup:
Winners (3) (record): 1973, 1974, 2000
Belgian Super Cup:
Winners (13): 1985, 1987, 1993, 1995, 2000, 2001, 2006, 2007, 2010, 2012, 2013, 2014, 2017

International

UEFA Cup:
Winners (1): 1982–83
Runners-up (1): 1983–84
Inter-Cities Fairs Cup
Runners-up (1): 1969–70UEFA Cup Winners' Cup:Winners (2): 1975–76, 1977–78
Runners-up (2): 1976–77, 1989–90UEFA Super Cup:Winners (2): 1976, 1978

MinorBruges Matins:Winners (2): 1985, 1988Tournoi de Paris:Winners (3): 1964, 1966, 1977Toulon Tournament:Winners (1): 1967Amsterdam Tournament:Winners (1):' 1976

Players

Current squad

Other players under contract

Out on loan

RSCA Futures (Reserves and Youth Academy)

Club staff

Managers

There have been a total of 37 permanent managers and 3 caretaker managers of Anderlecht since the appointment of the first manager, Sylva Brébart, in 1920. The club's longest-serving manager is Englishman Bill Gormlie, who served during nine seasons between 1950 and 1959. Frenchman Georges Perino is the first Anderlecht manager to have claimed a trophy, with the first championship win in 1946–47. Seven Anderlecht managers have managed the club on two occasions: Ernest Churchill Smith, Pierre Sinibaldi, Urbain Braems, Raymond Goethals, Arie Haan, Johan Boskamp and Franky Vercauteren. Other managers have also played another role in the club before being appointed manager, including Jean Dockx, who served three times as caretaker before being appointed manager.

Other sections
In 1993, Brussels D71 became Anderlecht's women team. The team has won three Leagues and five Cups since.

 Club presidents 

References

External links

 
Anderlecht at UEFA.COM
The Anderlecht academy way – These Football Times'' (2015)
Daily Anderlecht news and largest online fanzone 

 
R.S.C. Anderlecht
1908 establishments in Belgium
Association football clubs established in 1908
Multi-sport clubs in Belgium
Football clubs in Belgium
Football clubs in Brussels
UEFA Cup Winners' Cup winning clubs
UEFA Cup winning clubs
UEFA Super Cup winning clubs
Belgian Pro League clubs